Gallagher's free-tailed bat (Chaerephon gallagheri) is a free-tailed bat endemic to the Democratic Republic of the Congo. Only one individual has ever been documented.

Taxonomy and etymology
It was described as a new species in 1975 by David Harrison. The eponym for the species name "gallagheri" was Major Michael D. Gallagher, who collected the holotype.

Its distinct morphology has called into question whether it represents its own genus of bat.

Description

Its fur is umber in color, with the belly paler than its back.
Its flight membranes are grayish-black. Its ears are large and conjoined via the interaural membrane. The bat is likely able to evert this pocket to display the crest. It is unique in its family due to the presence of large, paired "nasal inflations" similar to those found in the mouse-tailed bats. Like other free-tailed bats, its tail extends beyond the margin of the uropatagium. It has a blunt snout. Its wings are long and narrow.

Biology and ecology
As only one individual—a male—has been documented, little is known about its biology and ecology. Based on other members of its genus, it is hypothesized that Gallagher's free-tailed bat forages for insects at relatively high altitudes with a fast but not maneuverable flight.

Range and habitat
It was captured in a mist net that was placed in the evergreen undergrowth of a partly-deciduous forest.
The forest where the holotype was collected has been heavily logged. It is nocturnal, possibly roosting in hollow trees, rock crevices, or caves during the day.

Conservation
It is currently evaluated as data deficient by the IUCN, meaning that not enough information is available to assess its conservation needs. From 1996–2008, it was considered critically endangered, the most dire assessment category. This species is known from only one individual ever documented—the holotype. Threats to this species are unclear, but possibly include habitat destruction.

References 

Chaerephon (bat)
Bats of Africa
Mammals of the Democratic Republic of the Congo
Endemic fauna of the Democratic Republic of the Congo
Mammals described in 1975
EDGE species
Southern Congolian forest–savanna mosaic